Edward Lucas may refer to:

Edward Lucas (Australian politician) (1857–1950), South Australian politician
Edward Lucas (congressman) (1780–1858), United States Congressman from Virginia
Edward Lucas (cricketer) (1848–1916), Australian cricketer
Edward Lucas (journalist) (born 1962), British journalist
Edward Lucas (died 1871), Member of Parliament for Monaghan 1834–1841
Ed Lucas (born 1939), sportswriter
Ed Lucas (baseball) (born 1982), American baseball third baseman
Eddie Lucas (born 1975), basketball player
E. V. Lucas (1868–1938), British author
Édouard Lucas (1842–1891), French mathematician

See also 
Eduardo Lucas, a fictional character from Arthur Conan Doyle's short story "The Adventure of the Second Stain"